Vijay Kumar Khandelwal (22 April 1936 – 12 November 2007) was a member of the 14th Lok Sabha of India. He represented the Betul constituency of Madhya Pradesh and was a member of the Bharatiya Janata Party (BJP) political party.

He was also member of 11th 12th and 13th Lok Sabha from Betul.

He was survived by his wife Mrs Kanti, 1 daughter and two sons, one being Hemant Khandelwal who became MP from Betul in by-elections after his death.

External links
 Members of Fourteenth Lok Sabha - Parliament of India website
 Death Notice

1936 births
2007 deaths
India MPs 2004–2009
India MPs 1999–2004
India MPs 1998–1999
India MPs 1996–1997
Bharatiya Janata Party politicians from Madhya Pradesh
People from Betul, Madhya Pradesh
Lok Sabha members from Madhya Pradesh